Isturgia famula is a moth of the family Geometridae. It is known from southern Europe.

Adults are on wing from May to June and are on wing during the day on sunny days.

The larvae feed on Cytisus, Genista, Sarothamnus, Spartium and Ulex species. It overwinters as a pupa in the ground.

External links

Fauna Europaea
Moths and Butterflies of Europe and North Africa
Lepiforum.de

Macariini
Moths of Europe
Taxa named by Eugenius Johann Christoph Esper
Moths described in 1787